is a Japanese manga series by Tetsuya Imai. It began serialization from December 2012 in Tokuma Shoten's seinen manga magazine Monthly Comic Ryū. It has been collected in nine tankōbon volumes. The manga won the Japan Media Arts Festival's New Face Award in 2013. An anime television series adaptation by J.C.Staff aired from April to June 2017.

Summary
The existence of humans with supernatural powers is kept a dark secret, hidden from the outside world save a research facility created to understand the principles behind these people, known as 'Dreams of Alice'. The story centers around Sana, an orphan girl belonging to the research facility as an experimental test subject, and nicknamed "Red Queen" due to her immense power despite her youth and childlike demeanour. After a narrow escape from the research facility, she wanders to the city of Shinjuku and meets an old man named Zouroku Kashimura, who kindly takes her in after sympathising with her story. Soon, he adopts her as his granddaughter as they grow close during their time together, be it during dangerous situations when trying to evade the research facility and everyday troubles of Sana growing to know the outside world better.

Characters

A girl with the ability to teleport and create anything she can imagine, Sana was being studied at a secret research facility until she decided to escape. She eventually crosses paths with Zouroku, who decides to take her in. Sana is also called  due to her immense power despite her being only a child.

A rather grumpy old man with a mysterious past. He works as a florist and is Sanae's grandfather. He eventually takes Sana into his home as well.

Zouroku's granddaughter, Sanae lives under his care due to the death of her parents and became something of an older sister to Sana.

A Dream of Alice and Yonaga's older twin sister. She was friends with Sana in the research facility but now works to take her back. She can materialize any object connected to a chain.

A Dream of Alice and Asahi's younger twin sister. She was friends with Sana in the research facility but now works to take her back. She can materialize a bow and arrow.

 Naito's assistant, who also happens to be Dream of Alice. She has access to a storeroom containing 666 different weapons and items (including 13 grimoires) which she can materialize at any time. She is a Naicho agent.

 An old acquaintance of Zouroku who works for the police and is interested in seeing whether Dreams of Alice can coexist with humans.

 A tech specialist who works with Naito and Ichijo to track Dreams of Alice.

 Also known as "Minnie C.", Minnie is a former United States Marine Corps second lieutenant and a Dream of Alice. Her husband was killed in action during a tour of service in Iraq. She voluntarily works with the research facility to retrieve Sana. She can materialize a pair of giant arms that resemble her late husband's. In exchange for shrinking their size, Minnie can increase the number of arms she materializes and can even make them invisible to the naked eye. Her major goal in working with the research facility is to hopefully find a way to bring her husband back from the dead.

 The director of the research facility secretly studying Dreams of Alice.

A Dream of Alice being studied in the research facility who was with Kitō when he and the Hinagari twins were searching for Sana. He is bright and calm. He creates whatever he is able to draw (e.g. Zoroku's car, cardboard robot in the car). He is seen constantly drawing. He does not like Minnie C.

Hatori Shikishima is an elementary school student with a troubled home life. After failing to get into a prominent school, her mother turns emotionally neglectful towards Hatori and her parents begin to constantly argue, which Hatori blames herself for. Hatori discovers her Dream of Alice can manipulate her environment and her parents to her desires.

Ayumu Miho is Hatori's best friend and classmate and a good athlete in soccer. At first she enjoys Hatori's strange powers and the two play pranks and have fun, but she becomes more concerned about Hatori as her personality begins to change.

Media

Manga
The manga series began serialization from December 2012 in Tokuma Shoten's seinen manga magazine Monthly Comic Ryū. It has been collected in nine tankōbon volumes. The manga won the Japan Media Arts Festival's New Face Award in 2013. The series moved to online-only serialization when Comic Ryū changed formats on June 19, 2018.

Anime
An anime television series adaptation by J.C.Staff aired on April 2, 2017 with an extended 44-minute first episode and ended on June 25, 2017. It is directed by Katsushi Sakurabi and written by Fumihiko Takayama, with character designs by Kazunori Iwakura and music by To-Mas Soundsight Fluorescent Forest. It was simulcasted by Crunchyroll and Funimation provided the English dub. The series ran for 12 episodes. The series' opening theme is "Wonder Drive" by Oresama, and the ending theme is "Chant" by Toi Toy Toi.

References

External links
  
 

2017 anime television series debuts
Anime series based on manga
Fantasy anime and manga
Funimation
J.C.Staff
Manga adapted into television series
Seinen manga
Seven Seas Entertainment titles
Tokuma Shoten manga
Tokyo MX original programming